The 2005 Holy Cross Crusaders football team was an American football team that represented the College of the Holy Cross during the 2005 NCAA Division I-AA football season. Holy Cross finished fourth in the Patriot League.

In their second year under head coach Tom Gilmore, the Crusaders compiled a 6–5 record. Gideon Akande, John O'Neil and Steve Silva were the team captains.

The Crusaders outscored opponents 317 to 263. Holy Cross' 3–3 conference placed fourth out of seven in the Patriot League standings. 

Holy Cross played its home games at Fitton Field on the college campus in Worcester, Massachusetts.

Schedule

References

Holy Cross
Holy Cross Crusaders football seasons
Holy Cross Crusaders football